Priva is a genus of plant in family Verbenaceae. It contains the following species (but this list may be incomplete):
 Priva auricoccea, A.Meeuse
 Priva socotrana, Moldenke

Gallery

 
Verbenaceae genera
Taxonomy articles created by Polbot